Haseena Khan is a Bangladeshi scientist, professor and fellow of Bangladesh Academy of Sciences. She is known for her lead on decoding Genome of Tenualosa ilisha from the river Padma. She was awarded Independence Day Award, the highest state award given by the government of Bangladesh for her contribution on research and training. Haseena Khan is also known for her contribution to jute genome decoding under Maqsudul Alam's lead.

Biography 
Haseena Khan was born in Gendaria, Old Dhaka to mother Begum Khodeza Khatun and father M A Khalek. Her father was a government employee. Khan was eighth among nine siblings. Two years after birth, her father was transferred to Kolkata, India as an Ambassador. Khan's family also moved there. As a result, she spent her childhood in Kolkata. Haseena Khan is married and mother of one daughter.

Education 
Haseena Khan started her schooling at a Missionary School, Queen of The Mission in Kolkata. In 1960, her family moved back to Old Dhaka and she enrolled into Saint Xavier School, Lakkhibazar. She finished her O-level in 1970. Khan passed her HSC from Holy Cross College in 1974 and enrolled in the Department of Biochemistry at Dhaka University. She completed her graduation in 1976. In 1985 Khan received her PhD in Molecular Biology from University of Sussex, England.

Work 
Haseena Khan started her career as lecturer at Dhaka University in 1982. After completing her PhD in England, she joined Biochemistry Department as an Assistant Professor. She is the head of the Biochemistry and Molecular Biology Department of Dhaka University from 1995. She has also served as chairman of Department of Genetics and Biotechnology from 2001 to 2005. Currently she is working as a fellow at the Bangladesh Academy of Sciences.
In 2018, Haseena Khan and her team decoded the genome sequence of  Bangladesh's national fish, Ilish with the "Tenualosa ilisha Genome Project".

Award and achievements 
 UNESCO/ROSTSCA Award for Young Scientist, 1989  
 Bangladesh Academy of Sciences, M O Ghani Gold Medal, 2011 
 For contribution on discover genome sequence of Jute, Kazi Mahbubuddin Gold Award, 2015 
 Mani Singh-Farhad Memorial Trust Award, 2016
 Independence Day Award, 2019

References 

Bangladeshi scientists
Living people
Bengali scientists
University of Dhaka alumni
Academic staff of the University of Dhaka
Fellows of Bangladesh Academy of Sciences
Bangladeshi women academics
Year of birth missing (living people)
Recipients of the Independence Day Award